Bathyclarias eurydon is a species of airbreathing catfish endemic to Lake Malawi, in the countries of Malawi, Mozambique and Tanzania.  This species grows to a length of 105 cm TL (41.3 inches).

References
 

Bathyclarias
Fish of Africa
Fish described in 1959
Taxonomy articles created by Polbot